Belčišta is a village in the municipality of Debarca, North Macedonia. It used to be municipality of its own. It is the municipality center of Debarca municipality.

Demographics
According to the 2002 census, the village had a total of 437 inhabitants. Ethnic groups in the village include:

Macedonians 436
Serbs 1

References

Villages in Debarca Municipality